Nicolae Sulac (9 September 1936 – 8 April 2003) was a folk music singer from the Republic of Moldova.

Throughout his career, he sang the hits such as "What a nice cuckoo is singing" (Ce frumos mai cântă cucul), "Youth" (Tinerețe, tinerețe), "Magheran green leaf" (Foaie verde mageran), "When my father comes" (Când tata va veni), "Sulac's flower" (Floarea lui Sulac), Doinas "Miorița" and „Mouring Doina” (Doina de Jale), "In the Prut forest"(În pădurea de la Prut), etc.

Biography 

Nicolae Sulac was born on 9 September 1936 in the village of Sadîc, County of Cahul, România (now the Republic of Moldova). His artistic career began in the Moldavian Soviet Socialist Republic, in the Doina choir chapel (since 1959). In 1965,  Nicolae Sulac became the lead singer of the "Fluieraș" ensemble, ensemble that launched many folk musicians from Moldova. In the 1970s and early 1980s he performed as the leading singer of the "Lăutarii" ensemble.

Nicolae Sulac is the winner of awards of the Union of Soviet Socialist Republics (USSR), and later of the Republic of Moldova, and was awarded the Order of the Republic (1992).

In 2002, he set up a fund for supporting folk music.

Nicolae Sulac sing the songs exclusively in Romanian language, being applauded every time by the whole hall, even by those who did not know the Romanian language.

By the end of his life, Sulac had a wish to move to Iași,  the  town he liked the most and where he used to meet with the  friends.

He died in Chișinău in 2003 after a stroke and was buried in the Chișinău Central Cemetery. On October 9, 2004, his bust was inaugurated at the Central Cemetery.

In 2007, postum, Nicolae Sulac's album On a Edge of Road (La o margine de drum) appeared on the market.

His daughter, Doina Sulac, is following the family tradition. She is a singer of folk music like her famous father.

Discography 
 "Cântec de veselie" (1973)
 "Nicolae Sulac și Lăutarii" (1984)
 "Dorul meu e numai dor" (1999-2000)
 "De ziua lui" (2003)
 "La o margine de drum" (2006)

Awards and honors
 Order of the Republic (Moldova) 
 Artist al Poporului 
 Laureat al Premiului de Stat
 Festivalul-Concurs Naţional al Interpreţilor Cântecului Popular "Nicolae Sulac" 
 "Nicolae Sulac" School
 People's Artist of the USSR

References

External links 
YouTube channel
 Friends and admirers remember late Nicolae Sulac on day when he would have turned 73 
 Literatura şi Arta, Omagiu lui Nicolae Sulac 
 Festivalul „Nicolae Sulac” la cea de-a treia ediţie

Romanian people of Moldovan descent
1936 births
2003 deaths
Moldovan musicians
People from Cahul District
Recipients of the Order of the Republic (Moldova)